El Cisne is a city in the southern region of Ecuador, in Loja province, about  from the city of Loja.

The city is known for the much venerated Marian National Shrine of Our Lady of El Cisne.

History

The inhabitants of El Cisne region had wanted their own virgin Mary shrine similar to the Virgin of Guadalupe in Mexico City. Representatives of the city in 1594 requested sculptor Don Diego de Robles to build the Virgin de El Cisne statue which he made from the wood of a cedar tree. Each year on August 17 thousands of pilgrims gather in El Cisne to carry the Virgin Mary statue in a religious procession to the cathedral of Loja where it is the focus of a great festival on September 8 and is later returned to El Cisne.

Image gallery

Notes 

Populated places in Loja Province